The Alabama and Gulf Coast Railway  is a Class II railroad owned by Genesee & Wyoming. It operates  of track from the Pensacola, Florida export terminals, west of downtown, north to Columbus, Mississippi, with trackage rights along BNSF Railway to Amory, Mississippi. A branch uses trackage rights along Norfolk Southern from Kimbrough, Alabama west and south to Mobile, Alabama, with separate trackage at the end of the line in Mobile.

History

Predecessor lines
The current AGR is composed of numerous lines built during the late 19th and early 20th centuries, which were gradually consolidated into a system that was purchased by the St. Louis – San Francisco Railway and remained under that railroad or its successor's control until 1997, when it was spun off into an independent company.

Pre-1922
The earliest ancestor of the AGR was the Pensacola and Mobile Railroad and Manufacturing Company, which in 1861 constructed  of track between Muscogee, Florida and Cantonment, Florida. This line was dismantled by Confederate forces during the Civil War so that the iron rails could be used elsewhere. The railroad was not rebuilt until 1877. In 1874, the company took control of the Pensacola and Perdido Railroad, which ran west from Pensacola about five miles to a lumber mill at Millview, Florida on Perdido Bay.  In 1892, the system merged with the Pensacola, Alabama and Tennessee Railroad, which connected the Millview and Muscogee branches. Shortly thereafter, the railroad was renamed the Gulf Ports Terminal Railway.

In 1910, the Gulf Ports Terminal Railway was acquired by Southern States Lumber, which operated  of track to move lumber from forests in Baldwin County, Alabama, to its large mill at Muscogee, and on to the port of Pensacola for export.

In 1911, the railroad was acquired by the Gulf, Florida, and Alabama Railway. Soon after, construction of a line from Cantonment to Pensacola was begun, being completed in 1913. Almost immediately following the completion of this line, another, much longer line was begun, this one from Cantonment north via Atmore and Frisco City, Alabama to an interchange with the Southern Railway at Kimbrough, Alabama. The line, including a large bridge over the Alabama River, was completed in 1915.

1922-1997
In 1922, the Gulf, Florida, and Alabama Railway was acquired by the Muscle Shoals, Birmingham and Pensacola Railroad (MSB&P), which only three years later was bought by the Frisco (St. Louis – San Francisco Railway). After the acquisition, the Frisco constructed a line from Aberdeen, Mississippi to Kimbrough, connecting the former MSB&P with the rest of the Frisco's system. This line was completed in 1928.

During the middle of the 20th century, the railroad operated as part of the Frisco, moving bulk products south to Pensacola for export and produce products north, although chemical and paper products took on increased importance by the 1970s. Passenger service over the line continued until 1955, when the Sunnyland, operating between Pensacola and Kansas City, Missouri, via Amory, Mississippi, and Memphis, Tennessee, was discontinued.

In 1980, the Frisco was acquired by the Burlington Northern Railroad (BN), itself a product of a merger of several railroads in 1970. In 1995, the BN merged with the Atchison, Topeka and Santa Fe Railway to form the BNSF Railway.

Current railroad
In 1997, when BNSF spun off the route between Kimbrough and Pensacola, the Alabama and Gulf Coast was formed to take over operations. In 2003, BNSF sold additional trackage to the AGR:  a line between Kimbrough and Columbus, Mississippi, as well as isolated trackage near Mobile, Alabama formerly part of the Alabama, Tennessee and Northern Railroad. As part of this deal, the AGR gained trackage rights on BNSF between Columbus and Amory and on the Norfolk Southern Railway between Mobile and Kimbrough.

In 2002, the AGR, which had been formerly owned by States Rail, Inc., a short-line holding company, was acquired by RailAmerica. In late 2012, Genesee & Wyoming acquired the railroad as part of its acquisition of RailAmerica.

Fleet
As of December 2020, the AGR fleet consisted of the following:

Route

The AGR operates on a total of 339 miles of owned and leased trackage in Florida, Alabama, and Mississippi. Its also runs via trackage rights over BNSF Railway between Columbus and Amory, MS and Norfolk Southern Railway between Kimbrough and Mobile, AL. The AGR is separated into the following four subdivisions.

The following route maps at right were created using actual track charts, timetables and maps with satellite imagery.

Traffic
The railroad's traffic comes mainly from chemicals and plastics, lumber and forest products, metals, pulp and paper.  The AGR hauled around 61,000 carloads in 2008.

See also

St. Louis – San Francisco Railway
List of United States railroads
List of Florida railroads
List of Mississippi railroads

References

External links

 Official Website
 "Pensacola & Mobile" at Confederate Railroads
 "Gulf, Florida and Alabama Railway" at Taplines:  Short Line and Industrial Railroading in the South; includes pictures and map

Florida railroads
Alabama railroads
Mississippi railroads
Regional railroads in the United States
RailAmerica
Railway companies established in 1997
Spin-offs of the BNSF Railway
1997 establishments in the United States